Hopewell is a historic home located at Providence, Cecil County, Maryland.  It is a -half story, mid-18th-century stone structure with a gable roof. It is one of the earliest farmhouses still standing in the broad Elk Creek valley.

It was listed on the National Register of Historic Places in 1979.

References

External links
, including photo from 1979, Maryland Historical Trust

Houses on the National Register of Historic Places in Maryland
Houses in Cecil County, Maryland
National Register of Historic Places in Cecil County, Maryland